Peel's Acts (as they are commonly known) were Acts of the Parliament of the United Kingdom. They consolidated provisions from a large number of earlier statutes which were then repealed. Their purpose was to simplify the criminal law. The term refers to the Home Secretary who sponsored them, Sir Robert Peel. 

Some writers apply the term Peel's Acts to the series of Acts passed between 1826 and 1832. Other writers apply the term Peel's Acts specifically to five of those Acts, namely chapters 27 to 31 of the session 7 & 8 Geo 4 (1827).

According to some writers, the Criminal Law Act 1826 was the first of Peel's Acts.

The Acts were the product of a failed attempt to codify the criminal law.

The Acts 7 & 8 Geo 4 cc 27 to 31
These Acts are:
The Criminal Statutes Repeal Act 1827 (7 & 8 Geo 4 c 27) 
The Criminal Law Act 1827 (7 & 8 Geo 4 c 28)
The Larceny Act 1827 (7 & 8 Geo 4 c 29)
The Malicious Injuries to Property Act 1827 (7 & 8 Geo 4 c 30)
The Remedies against the Hundred Act 1827 (7 & 8 Geo 4 c 31), also called the Riot Act 1827

The Criminal Law (Ireland) Act 1828 (9 Geo 4 c 54), and the Acts 9 Geo 4 c 53, 55 and 56, made similar provision for Ireland.

The Acts replaced by the Criminal Law Consolidation Acts 1861
James Edward Davis said that the Criminal Law Consolidation Acts 1861 are new editions of Peel's Acts. The Acts listed below were replaced by the Criminal Law Consolidation Acts 1861. There were two separate sets of broadly identical Acts for England and Ireland respectively.

The first four Acts on this list consolidated 316 Acts, representing almost four-fifths of all offences.

England
The Criminal Statutes Repeal Act 1827 (7 & 8 Geo 4 c 27) (48 statutes)
The Larceny Act 1827 (7 & 8 Geo 4 c 29) (92 statutes)
The Malicious Injuries to Property Act 1827 (7 & 8 Geo 4 c 30) (effectively replacing the statutes abolished by c 27 and c 29)
The Offences against the Person Act 1828 (9 Geo 4 c 31) (56 statutes)
The Forgery Act 1830 (11 Geo 4 & 1 Will 4 c 66) (120 statutes)
The Coinage Offences Act 1832 (2 & 3 Will 4 c 34)

Ireland
(Repeals) (9 Geo 4 c 53)
9 Geo 4 c 55, sometimes referred to as the Larceny Act 1828 or the Larceny (Ireland) Act 1828
9 Geo 4 c 56, sometimes referred to as the Malicious Injuries to Property Act 1828 or the Malicious Injuries to Property (Ireland) Act 1828
10 Geo 4 c 34, sometimes referred to as the Offences against the Person (Ireland) Act 1829 and as the Offences against the Person Act (Ireland) 1829

References
John Frederick Archbold. Peel's Acts, and all the other Criminal Statutes passed from the First Year of the Reign of George IV to the Present Time. Third Edition. Saunders and Benning. Fleet Street, London. 1835. Volume 1. 
John Frederick Archbold. Peel's Acts. William Benning. London. 1828. Google Books: Peel's Acts, with the Forms of Indictments, Etc., and the Evidence Necessary to Support Them Peel's Acts, with the Forms of Indictments, Etc., and the Evidence Necessary to Support Them.
An Alphabetical Arrangement of Mr. Peel's Acts, Lord Lansdowne's Act, &c. &c. Second Edition. J & W T Clarke. Portugal Street, Lincoln's Inn, London. 1830. Google Books: An Alphabetical Arrangement of Mr Peel's Acts, Lord Lansdowne's Act, &c. &c. ... and other statutes relating to the criminal law ... Second edition ... By a Barrister. [i.e. John Frederick Archbold.] An Alphabetical Arrangement of Mr. Peel's Acts, Lord Lansdowne's Act, Etc., Etc., Relating to the Better Administration of Criminal Justice, the Consolidation of Larceny; Malicious Injuries to Property; the Regulation of Remedies Against the Hundred; the Consolidation of Offenses Against the Person; and the New Acts Relating to Poaching, Smuggling, and Setting Spring Guns, Etc., and Other Statutes Relating to the Criminal Law. With Explanatory Notes, Forms of Indictments, and the Evidence in Support of Each Indictment An Alphabetical Arrangement of Mr. Peel's Acts, Lord Lansdowne's Act, Etc., Etc., Relating to the Better Administration of Criminal Justice, the Consolidation of Larceny; Malicious Injuries to Property; the Regulation of Remedies Against the Hundred; the Consolidation of Offenses Against the Person; and the New Acts Relating to Poaching, Smuggling, and Setting Spring Guns, Etc., and Other Statutes Relating to the Criminal Law. With Explanatory Notes, Forms of Indictments, and the Evidence in Support of Each Indictment.
An Alphabetical Arrangement of Mr. Peel's Acts. Printed for J & W T Clarke. Portugal Street, Lincoln's Inn, London. 1827 Google Books.
Isaac Espinasse. The Five Acts called Mr. Peel's Acts. London. 1827. The Five Acts Called Mr. Peel's Acts (7 and 8 Geo. IV. C. 27, 28, 29, 30, 31,) Reduced to Distinct Heads, and Adapted to the Arrangement of Burn's Justice
George Pyne Andrewes. An Abridgement of Mr. Peel's five important Acts of Parliament just passed for the improvement of the Criminal Law. London. 1827. Catalogue.
The Late Acts of Parliament amending the Criminal Law of England, commonly called Peel's Acts. James Ross. Hobart Town. 1830.  Catalogue. Bibliography.
John Tidd Pratt. A Collection of the late Statutes, passed for the Administration of Criminal Justice in England; comprising 7 Geo. IV., Cap. 64, 7 & 8 Geo. IV., Cap. 18, 27, 28, 29, 30 & 31. Second Edition. W Benning. Fleet Street, London. 1827. Google Books.
The Six Acts Passed in the Seventh and Eighth Years of the Reign of His Present Majesty for Further Improving the Administration of Criminal Justice in England. Edward Dunn and Son. Fleet Street, London. 1827. Google Books.
The Annual Register . . . of the Year 1827, pages 185 to 187.
William C M'Dermott. The Criminal Code for Ireland, as amended by the late Enactments. Printed for John Cumming. Dublin. 1829. Google Books.

English criminal law
Acts